Hwandudaedo ("ring-pommel sword") is the modern Korean term for one of earliest original types of Korean sword, appearing  in the  Proto–Three Kingdoms of Korea.
These swords were at first symbols of a ruler's power, but their availability increased in the 5th century, and it became a more widespread symbol of military or political rank. The frequency of finds declines in the 6th century.

The hwandudaedo was a large military sword made for battle, as it had a thick back and sharpened blade. This sword's name was given because of the round shape of the pommel ( 대도把頭). The swords were richly decorated, with inlay work and especially by elaborate pommel (sword) shapes.

Hwandudaedo subtypes are distinguished based on their decoration.  They include  Sohwandudaedo (no decoration on the pommel rings), Samyeophwandudaedo (pommel ring with three opened leaves), Samruhwandudaedo (three pommel rings forming a triangle), Yonghwandudaedo (pommel with dragon),  Bonghwandudaedo (pommel with phoenix), Bonghwangmun (a pattern of a legendary bird), Indongdangchomun,  Samyeopmun, Wondudaedo, Gyududaedo, Samruhwandudaedo, Bangdudaedo,  Duchudaedo.

References

 History and characteristics of Korean Swords by Park Je Gwang – Curator War Memorial of Korea

Korean swords